Juniata Township is a township in Bedford County, Pennsylvania, United States. The population was 897 at the 2020 census.

Geography
Juniata Township is located in western Bedford County, along the Somerset County line. It is bordered to the northeast by Napier Township, to the east by Harrison Township, and to the south by Londonderry Township. Neighboring Somerset County townships are Allegheny Township to the west and Shade Township to the north.

Recreation
Two small portions of the Pennsylvania State Game Lands Number 104 are located at the southern corner of the township and a portion of Shawnee State Park is located near the northeast corner of the township.

Demographics

As of the census of 2000, there were 1,016 people, 395 households, and 310 families residing in the township.  The population density was 21.4 people per square mile (8.3/km2).  There were 585 housing units at an average density of 12.3/sq mi (4.8/km2).  The racial makeup of the township was 98.23% White, 0.10% Native American, 0.20% Asian, 0.20% from other races, and 1.28% from two or more races. Hispanic or Latino of any race were 1.18% of the population.

There were 395 households, out of which 27.8% had children under the age of 18 living with them, 67.3% were married couples living together, 6.3% had a female householder with no husband present, and 21.5% were non-families. 18.5% of all households were made up of individuals, and 9.1% had someone living alone who was 65 years of age or older.  The average household size was 2.56 and the average family size was 2.87.

In the township the population was spread out, with 22.8% under the age of 18, 5.0% from 18 to 24, 28.0% from 25 to 44, 29.6% from 45 to 64, and 14.6% who were 65 years of age or older.  The median age was 41 years. For every 100 females there were 105.7 males.  For every 100 females age 18 and over, there were 104.7 males.

The median income for a household in the township was $34,081, and the median income for a family was $35,952. Males had a median income of $30,737 versus $20,156 for females. The per capita income for the township was $13,990.  About 13.1% of families and 14.9% of the population were below the poverty line, including 11.3% of those under age 18 and 21.1% of those age 65 or over.

References

Populated places established in 1790
Townships in Bedford County, Pennsylvania